Poco is an American country rock band formed in 1968.

Poco or POCO may also refer to:

 Postcolonialism
 Poco (album), a 1970 album by the band Poco
 Plain Old CLR Object, term used by developers targeting the Common Language Runtime of the .NET Framework 
 POCO C++ Libraries, collection of open-source, C++, class libraries for network centric applications
 "PoCo", a nickname for Port Coquitlam, British Columbia, Canada
 In musical notation, qualifier meaning "a little"
 POCO (company), a smartphone company
 Poco, the playable character in Woody Poco, a Japanese video game released in 1986

See also
 Pocho (disambiguation)
 Poco-poco, an Indonesian mass folk dance